Michelle Ballentine (born 31 August 1975, in Saint Catherine Parish) is a retired Jamaican athlete who specialised in the 800 metres. She represented her country at the 2004 Summer Olympics reaching the semifinals.

She has personal bests of 1:59.92 outdoors and 2:03.77 indoors, both set in 2004.

Competition record

References

1975 births
Living people
Jamaican female middle-distance runners
Athletes (track and field) at the 2002 Commonwealth Games
Commonwealth Games competitors for Jamaica
Athletes (track and field) at the 2004 Summer Olympics
Olympic athletes of Jamaica
People from Saint Catherine Parish
20th-century Jamaican women
21st-century Jamaican women